Hendrik Willem Schweickhardt (born Heinrich Wilhelm Schweickhardt; 1747–1797), was an 18th-century painter from Germany.

Biography 
He was born in Hamm and moved to The Hague where he became a pupil of Hieronymus Lapis and started a family. He moved to London in 1786 for economic reasons and did quite well there. His daughter Katharina learned to draw and paint and became a poet; she married Willem Bilderdijk after having an affair with him in 1795 when he taught her and her sisters in London.
Schweickhardt died in London.

References

External links
 
 Heinrich Wilhelm Schweickardt on Artnet

1747 births
1797 deaths
18th-century Dutch painters
18th-century Dutch male artists
18th-century German painters
18th-century German male artists
German male painters
People from Hamm